Mats Trygg (born June 1, 1976) is a Norwegian ice hockey defenceman. He currently plays with the Vålerenga Ishockey of the Norwegian GET-ligaen.

Playing career
He started his senior career with Spektrum Flyers in 1994 and played two seasons before signing with Manglerud Star in 1996. He stayed there for three seasons.

In 1999 he signed with the Swedish Elitserien club Färjestad and won the Swedish Championship with them in 2002. He played there for six seasons, before moving to Germany and the Deutsche Eishockey Liga.

In 2005, he joined his best friend and fellow national team player, Martin Knold, playing for Iserlohn Roosters. He stayed only a single season with the Roosters, before getting signed by Kölner Haie in the same league. After four seasons in Cologne, he moved to Hamburg and the Freezers in 2010.

On January 7, 2014, Trygg was named to Team Norway's official 2014 Winter Olympics roster. During the third period of the game against Canada on February 13, he was injured. While hobbling off the ice, he was struck by a referee who was skating backwards and knocked to the ice, sliding to the boards.

Personal life
His twin brother, Marius Trygg, also plays ice hockey, as well as their younger brother Mathias.

Career statistics

Regular season and playoffs

International

References

External links

1976 births
Living people
Ice hockey people from Oslo
Norwegian twins
Twin sportspeople
Färjestad BK players
Ice hockey players at the 2010 Winter Olympics
Hamburg Freezers players
HV71 players
Iserlohn Roosters players
Kölner Haie players
Lørenskog IK players
Manglerud Star Ishockey players
NIHF Golden Puck winners
Norwegian expatriate ice hockey people
Norwegian ice hockey defencemen
Olympic ice hockey players of Norway
Ice hockey players at the 2014 Winter Olympics
Spektrum Flyers players
Vålerenga Ishockey players
Norwegian expatriate sportspeople in Sweden
Norwegian expatriate sportspeople in Germany